St. John Legh Clowes (1907–1951) was a South African writer and director.

Biography 
Clowes wrote the play Dear Murderer which was turned into a film.

His parents - Captain Philip Cecil Clowes and Daphne Scholz, were married in Cape Town in 1903. (Daphne's sister Avice married actor/writer Roland Pertwee in 1911.) His grandfather, and namesake, was married to Elizabeth Caroline Bingham, the daughter of Denis Arthur Bingham, 3rd Baron Clanmorris. His paternal aunt was the writer Elinor Mordaunt.

Clowes died in London in 1951.

Select credits
Frozen Fate (1929) – writer
Grand Prix (1934) – writer, director
Soldier, Sailor (1944) – writer
Battle for Music (1945) – writer
Dear Murderer (1947) – original play
Things Happen at Night (1948) – producer, writer
No Orchids for Miss Blandish (1948) – writer, director

References

External links

St John Legh Clowes at TCMDB

South African film directors
1907 births
1951 deaths
20th-century screenwriters